Fjords of Quebec
 Glaciers of Quebec
 Mountains of Quebec
 Laurentides
 Appalaches
 Monts Chic-Chocs
 Collines Montérégiennes
 Monts Torngat
 Volcanoes in Quebec
 Islands of Quebec
 Lakes of Quebec
 List of dams and reservoirs in Quebec
 Rivers of Quebec
 Waterfalls of Quebec
 Valleys of Quebec
 World Heritage Sites in Quebec (2)
 Miguasha National Park
 Old Quebec
 Extreme points of Quebec
 Borders of Quebec
 Other
 Canadian Shield
 St. Lawrence Lowlands

Quebec
Landforms